Shahbuz State Reserve was created on the area of 31.39 km² of Shahbuz District of Nakhchivan Autonomous Republic of Azerbaijan on June 16, 2003. The area of Batabat Lake is mainly surrounded by grassland. Medicinal herbs, oak trees etc. dominate the flora of the area. The most widely spread animals are partridge, broad-tailed nightingale, among mammals-brown bear, badger, lynx, etc.

It was established in June 2003 for the purpose of protecting rare and endangered species of plants and animals.

See also
 Nature of Azerbaijan
 National Parks of Azerbaijan
 State Reserves of Azerbaijan
 State Game Reserves of Azerbaijan

State reserves of Azerbaijan
Nakhchivan Autonomous Republic